Tursunoy Rakhimova (born 5 June 1997) is a Uzbekistani boxer. She competed in the women's flyweight event at the 2020 Summer Olympics.

References

External links
 

1997 births
Living people
Uzbekistani women boxers
Olympic boxers of Uzbekistan
Boxers at the 2020 Summer Olympics
Place of birth missing (living people)
20th-century Uzbekistani women
21st-century Uzbekistani women